Hui Xirui (born 4 January 1994) is a Chinese female badminton player.

Achievements

Asia Junior Championships
Girls' Singles

BWF Grand Prix 
The BWF Grand Prix has two level such as Grand Prix and Grand Prix Gold. It is a series of badminton tournaments, sanctioned by Badminton World Federation (BWF) since 2007.

Women's Singles

 BWF Grand Prix Gold tournament
 BWF Grand Prix tournament

BWF International Challenge/Series
Women's Singles

 BWF International Challenge tournament
 BWF International Series tournament
 BWF Future Series tournament

References

External links 
 

Living people
1994 births
Chinese female badminton players
Badminton players from Jiangsu
Universiade medalists in badminton
Universiade silver medalists for China
Medalists at the 2015 Summer Universiade